Club Deportivo Boiro is a Spanish football team based in Boiro, in the autonomous community of Galicia. Founded in 1966 it currently plays in Segunda División B – Group 1, holding home games at Campo de Barraña, which holds 1,500 spectators.

Season to season

|}

1 season in Segunda División B
11 seasons in Tercera División

Current squad

Honours
Tercera División: 2015–16

External links
Official website 
Futbolme team profile 
Estadios de España 

Football clubs in Galicia (Spain)
Association football clubs established in 1966
1966 establishments in Spain